Thomas Elliot (c. 1759 – 1832) was one of the main organ builders in England during the early 19th century.

History

The first records of Thomas Elliot as an organ builder date from 1790 when he was established in Holborn. Later he moved to premises on the Tottenham Court Road. He is thought to have worked for the company founded by John Snetzler.

He is thought to have formed a partnership with John Nutt, until Nutt's death in 1804.

Alexander Buckingham was foreman to Thomas Elliot for many years until establishing himself as an independent organ builder.

William Hill (1789–1870) married Thomas Elliot’s daughter Mary, and then joined the firm, which was renamed Elliot and Hill from 1825 until 1832.

Thomas Elliot died in 1832, and the business continued with William Hill, being known as William Hill & Sons.

Organs constructed

Church of St John the Baptist, Bromsgrove, 1809
All Saints' Church, Thornage, Norfolk, 1812
High Pavement Chapel, Nottingham, 1815
St. James' Church, Standard Hill, Nottingham, 1815
Christ Church Cathedral, Waterford, 1817
St Michael's Church, Broome, Norfolk, 1817
St Cassian's Church, Chaddesley Corbett, Worcestershire, 1817
St Michael Wood Street, 1818
Westminster Abbey Organ (for Coronation of King George IV at Westminster Abbey, London, 1821)
Old South Church (Third Church), Boston, Massachusetts, 1822
St Mary's Church, Wirksworth, 1826
St John The Baptist, Wolverley, 1830 (As "Elliot and Hill")
York Minster, 1832
Church of St Thomas the Martyr, Newcastle upon Tyne, 1832
 St Mary's Parish Church, Harby, Leicestershire. Built for Gedling Parish church, 1808 and installed by Alexander Buckingham. Transferred to Harby, Leicestershire, in 1874.

References

Pipe organ building companies
Organ builders of the United Kingdom
1759 births
1832 deaths
Musical instrument manufacturing companies of the United Kingdom